John Ireland Blackburne (26 May 1783 – 27 January 1874) was a British Conservative politician.

Born at Hale Hall, Lancashire, he was the son of John Blackburne, lord of the manor of Hale and  Member of Parliament for Lancashire, and his wife Anne née Robard of Shepton Mallet, Somerset. He was descended from two old Lancashire families, the Irelands and the Blackburnes.

He was elected to the House of Commons in 1807, sitting as MP for Newton until 1818. He subsequently became involved in the politics of the town of Warrington, helping to establish the Warrington Operative Conservative Association. Such associations were established in the north west of England in order to enlist the support of working class men against the emerging Radical and Chartist movements.

He returned to parliament at the 1835 general election when he won the parliamentary borough of Warrington from the Liberal Party. He sat as the town's MP until he retired in 1847. He was a strong defender of the established church, and was opposed to the endowment of Roman Catholic priests and the appropriation of church property for secular purposes. He also supported the improvement of working conditions, in particular the Ten Hours Act of 1847.

Blackburne married his cousin, Anne Bamford. Their son, also named John Ireland Blackburne, was also a member of parliament from 1875 – 1885.

References

External links 
 

1783 births
1874 deaths
UK MPs 1807–1812
UK MPs 1812–1818
UK MPs 1835–1837
UK MPs 1837–1841
UK MPs 1841–1847
Tory MPs (pre-1834)
Conservative Party (UK) MPs for English constituencies